The 1990 Virginia State Elections took place on Election Day, November 5, 1990, the same day as the U.S. Senate and U.S. House elections in the state. The only statewide elections on the ballot were four constitutional referendums  to amend the Virginia State Constitution. Because Virginia state elections are held on off-years, no statewide officers or state legislative elections were held. All referendums were referred to the voters by the Virginia General Assembly.

Question 1

This amendment asked voters to lower the personal property tax rates for residents who are at least 65 years old and for residents who are permanently and totally disabled.

Question 2

This amendment asked voters to allocate the proceeds from private property seized and forfeited to the Commonwealth for drug law violations for funding law enforcement instead of being allocated to the Virginia Literacy Fund, which supports public education in the state.

Question 3

This amendment asked voters to establish a county/local-level tax for the purpose of funding local transportation projects and would have authorized counties to establish a new category of local debt for the purposes of funding local transportation.  Most counties in Virginia do not have any local taxes and voters rejected the amendment by a wide margin.

Question 4

This amendment asked voters to increase state taxes for the purpose of funding state transportation projects and would have authorized the Virginia General Assembly to establish a new category of state debt for the purposes of funding transportation throughout Virginia.  Like the previous question, this amendment was very unpopular and was also rejected by voters.

References

1990 Virginia elections